WWE SmackDown is a professional wrestling television program.

Championships
WWE SmackDown Women's Championship
WWE SmackDown Tag Team Championship
WWE SmackDown Championship also known as the Universal Championship

Video games
WWF SmackDown! (video game)
WWF SmackDown! 2: Know Your Role
WWF SmackDown! Just Bring It
WWE SmackDown! Shut Your Mouth
WWE SmackDown! Here Comes the Pain
WWE SmackDown! vs. Raw
WWE SmackDown! vs. Raw 2006
WWE SmackDown vs. Raw 2007
WWE SmackDown vs. Raw 2008
WWE SmackDown vs. Raw 2009
WWE SmackDown vs. Raw 2010
WWE SmackDown vs. Raw 2011
WWE SmackDown vs. Raw Online

Other
 SmackDown (WWE brand) a brand within the WWE
 WWE SmackDown roster the roster of those within the SmackDown brand
List of WWE SmackDown on-air personalities
List of WWE SmackDown guest stars
 History of WWE SmackDown